The name Mihalko, Михалко, originates from Hungary, Belarus and Ukraine.  The majority of the Mihalko families in the United States are located in the northeastern portion, primarily concentrated in the state of Pennsylvania.

Coat of arms
Name: Mihalko and Mihalkovich of Kurzem in Jász-Kun, Hungary, also Belarus and Ukraine. Ennobled by Leopold II, Holy Roman Emperor in 1790.

Shield: Per pale azure and argent, in dexter, on a mount vert, a lion counter-rampant or and in sinister on a mount vert, a leopard rampant proper, on a chief of the first, a sun in splendour in dexter or and an increscent moon in sinister of the second.

Crest: Out of a ducal coronet a demi lion or between a pair of wings per fesse, the dexter or and azure and the sinister gules and argent.
Mantling: Dexter, or and azure; sinister, argent and gules.

See also
List of Ukrainian Surnames

References
 U.S. Census Bureau, 1990.
 

Surnames